This is a list of years in Italy.

12th century

13th century

14th century

15th century

16th century

17th century

18th century

19th century

20th century

21st century

See also
 Timeline of Italian history

 
Italy history-related lists
Italy